Georgios Peglis (born 25 December 1973) is a retired Greek football defender.

References

1973 births
Living people
Greek footballers
Iraklis Thessaloniki F.C. players
Kavala F.C. players
AEP Paphos FC players
Enosis Neon Paralimni FC players
Olympiakos Nicosia players
Aris Limassol FC players
Association football defenders
Super League Greece players
Greek expatriate footballers
Expatriate footballers in Cyprus
Greek expatriate sportspeople in Cyprus